Undercover Man may refer to:
 Undercover Man (1942 film), an American Western film
 Undercover Man (1936 film), an American Western film
 Under-Cover Man, a 1932 American pre-Code crime film
 The Undercover Man, a 1949 American crime drama film noir